V6 News is an Indian Telugu language channel and current affairs television channel in the Indian State of Telangana. The 24-hour channel is journalist-driven, with a tagline News as it is. V6 News Telugu is completely free-to-air channel available free on YouTube and C-Band Satellite.

History
The channel started on 1 March 2012 and is owned by VIL Media Pvt Ltd. The channel's chief editor and CEO is Ankam Ravi, a journalist. It is a backed by a team of journalists.

Programmes
The channel airs shows like:

• Political Debates

• Good Morning Telangana

• Teenmar varthalu

• Maanasaveena

• World Food

• Telanganam

• Cinema Talkies

• Janapadam

• Spotlight

• Death Secrets

• USA Times

• Date Line

• Telangana Teertham

• Commercial

• Health• 9AM NEWS 
• 10AM NEWS• 11AM NEWS• 12 NEWS• MID-DAY NEWS• NEWS @ LUNCH• 3PM NEWS• 4PM NEWS• 5PM NEWS• 7PM LIVE• NEWS AT 9''   etc....

References

External links
 
 V6News Youtube channel
 V6News Twitter
 V6News InstaGram
 V6News Telegram
 V6News Free-To-Air

Telugu-language television channels
Television stations in Hyderabad
24-hour television news channels in India
Television channels and stations established in 2012